Thomas McGrath (born August 7, 1964) is an American voice actor, animator, screenwriter, and film director. He is known for the DreamWorks animated film Madagascar, which he co-directed  with Eric Darnell while voicing the character of Skipper the Penguin. The film spawned two direct sequels, along with a spin-off animated series and film based on the penguins in which McGrath reprised his role as Skipper. McGrath has also directed other DreamWorks animated films such as Megamind, The Boss Baby and its 2021 sequel.

Life and career
McGrath was born and raised in Lynnwood, Washington. He studied Industrial Design at the University of Washington and graduated from the Character Animation program at Cal Arts. McGrath's experience in both television and feature animation includes work as an animator on Cool World and Space Jam, storyboard artist and director for The Ren and Stimpy Show, and storyboard artist on the live action film Cats & Dogs. He also worked as a storyboard artist, concept artist and prop and set designer for How the Grinch Stole Christmas. McGrath also stepped in on Flushed Away by Aardman, the creators of The Curse of the Were-Rabbit, to help make improvements prior to its release. 

McGrath made his film directing debut as the co-director and co-writer of Madagascar along with Eric Darnell, where he also voiced the leader of the squad of penguin characters, Skipper. He reprised his role as Skipper and co-directed and co-wrote the sequel, Madagascar: Escape 2 Africa. He also worked on The Penguins of Madagascar, a spin-off TV series, as a creative consultant and as the voice of Skipper. He directed Megamind, released in November 2010.

In 2017, he directed The Boss Baby, and  has also directed the 2021 sequel The Boss Baby: Family Business.

Filmography

Feature films

Short films

Television series

Video games

References

External links 

 

1964 births
Living people
Animators from Washington (state)
American animated film directors
American male voice actors
California Institute of the Arts alumni
University of Washington School of Art + Art History + Design alumni
DreamWorks Animation people
Nickelodeon Animation Studio people
Showrunners
People from Lynnwood, Washington
American male screenwriters
Writers from Washington (state)
American storyboard artists
Film directors from Washington (state)